SB-269970 is a drug and research chemical developed by GlaxoSmithKline used in scientific studies. It is believed to act as a selective 5-HT7 receptor antagonist (EC50 = 1.25 nM) (or possibly inverse agonist). A subsequent study in guinea pig at a concentration of 10 μM showed that it also blocks the α2-adrenergic receptor. The large difference in test concentrations however confirms the selectivity of SB-269970 for the 5-HT7 receptor.

SB-269970 is used to study the 5-HT7 receptors which are thought to be involved in the function of several areas of the brain such as the hippocampus and thalamus, and regulation of dopamine release in the ventral tegmental area. Possible therapeutic uses for SB-269970 and other 5-HT7 antagonists include the treatment of anxiety and depression, and nootropic effects have also been noted in animal studies.

References

5-HT7 antagonists
Phenols
Pyrrolidines
Piperidines